Truck bed may refer to:

 Tonneau, an open area of a vehicle, which may be coverable with a tonneau cover.
 Pickup bed, the bed of the tonneau of a pickup truck
 Flatbed truck truckbed
 Dump truck truckbed

See also

 Truck (disambiguation)
 Bed (disambiguation)